Michael Mikes is a retired American soccer player who spent most of his career with the Colorado Foxes in the American Professional Soccer League.

Player
Mikes played for Scott Galagher in St. Louis as a child and graduated from St. John Vianney High School.  He attended the University of Evansville, playing on the men’s soccer team from 1983 to 1986.  He was a 1985 Third Team and 1986 Second Team All American.  In 2006, the University of Evansville inducted Mikes into the school’s Hall of Fame.  in 1990, Mikes joined the Colorado Foxes of the American Professional Soccer League, playing for them through at least 1995.  He also played four games for the Wichita Wings during the 1992-1993 National Professional Soccer League season.

Coach
In September 1991, Mikes became an assistant coach at Regis University.

References

Living people
American soccer players
American soccer coaches
American Professional Soccer League players
Colorado Foxes players
Evansville Purple Aces men's soccer players
National Professional Soccer League (1984–2001) players
Wichita Wings players
Association football midfielders
Year of birth missing (living people)